Spokane Shine is an American women’s soccer team, founded in 2010 in the city of Spokane, Washington. The team is a member of the Women's Premier Soccer League (WPSL), the second tier of women’s soccer in the United States. The team plays in the Northwest Division of the league. The team was born after the Spokane Black Widows WPSL team ceased to exist.

The team plays its home games at Joe Albi Stadium in Spokane. The club's colors are yellow and cobalt blue.

Players

2012 roster

Year-by-year

Competition history

Coaches
  Jason Quintero 2011–present

Stadia
 Stadium at Joe Albi Stadium; Spokane, Washington, 2011–present

References

External links 
 
 

   

Women's Premier Soccer League teams
Women's soccer clubs in the United States
Soccer clubs in Washington (state)
Association football clubs established in 2010
2010 establishments in Washington (state)